Francesco Trevisani (April 9, 1656 – July 30, 1746) was an Italian painter, active in the period called either early Rococo or late Baroque (barochetto).

Life
Born in Capodistria, Istria (modern Koper now in Slovenia, then part of the Republic of Venice), he was the son of Antonio Trevisani, an architect, by whom he was instructed in the first rudiments of design. He then studied in Venice under Antonio Zanchi. He moved to Rome, where he remained until his death, in 1746. His brother, Angelo Trevisani remained a prominent painter in Venice.

In Rome, he was supported by Cardinal Pietro Ottoboni. He was strongly influenced by Carlo Maratta, as it is manifest in his masterpiece, the frescoes in San Silvestro in Capite (1695–1696). In this commission, he worked alongside Giuseppe Chiari and Ludovico Gimignani. In Rome, he was favored with the patronage of Cardinal Chigi. Chigi employed him in several considerable works, and recommended him to the protection of Pope Clement XI, who not only commissioned him to paint one of the prophets in San Giovanni Laterano, but engaged him to decorate the cupola of the cathedral in Urbino. There he represented, in fresco, allegories of the four Quarters of the World, in which he displayed much invention and ingenuity. He was employed by the Duke of Modena, in copying the works of Correggio and Parmigianino, and also painted in Brunswick, Madrid, Munich, Stockholm, and Vienna.

He also shows Maratta's influence in the cartoons for baptismal chapel in St. Peter's Basilica, in the oval with Prophet Baruch in San Giovanni in Laterano, and in the Death of St. Joseph in Sant'Ignazio. Trevisani painted scenes from the Life of the Blessed Lucy of Narni in the church of Narni (1714–15).

He also painted the huge canvas for the main altar of the Basilica of the Mafra National Palace in Portugal.

He became a member of the Academy of Arcadia in 1712. Among his pupils were Francesco Civalli of Perugia, Cav. Lodovico Mazzanti, and Giovanni Batista Bruglii.

Trevisani died in Rome in 1746.

Works
Martyrdom of St Andrew, Sant'Andrea delle Fratte, Rome
Stigmata of St Francis, Santissime Stimmate di San Francesco, Rome
Frescos at Santa Chiara (St. Clare) chapel, San Silvestro in Capite, Rome
Prophet Baruch, San Giovanni in Laterano, Rome
Altar of the Ecstasy of Saint Francis at the Santissime Stimmate di San Francesco (Holy Stigmata of St. Francis)
Suicide of Lucretia (between 1680 and 1740)
Banquet of Cleopatra and Mark Anthony (1702), Palazzo Spada, Rome
Portrait of Cardinal Pietro Ottoboni, Bowes Museum, Durham, England
The Raising of Lazarus
Saint Mark
Saint Matthew
Madonna and Child
Peter Baptizing the Centurion Cornelius (1709)
Death of Alexander the Great, Musée des beaux-arts de Pau, France
Maria Clementina (1719)
Apelles Painting Campaspe (1720)
Apollo and Daphne (mid-18th century)
Diana and Endymion
Latona and the Frogs
Penitent Magdalene (1725) Prado Museum, Madrid.
Madonna with Child (1708-1710) Prado Museum .Madrid.
Madonna with sleeping Child (att) Real Academia de Bellas Artes de San Fernando, Madrid.
Works at Palazzo Corsini, Rome:
Martyrdom of St Lawrence
Martyrdom of St Lucia
Mary Magdalene

In January 2021 an episode the BBC Four series Britain's Lost Masterpieces, centred on the fine art collection of the Royal Pavilion in Brighton, uncovered a work of Trevisani, a portrayal of Mary Magdalene, previously attributed to an unknown artist.

Etchings and Drawings
Andrea Adami da Bolsa

References

Review of Francesco Trevisani: Eighteenth-Century Painter in Rome. Francis H. Dowley. The Art Bulletin (1979) pp. 146–151.

External links

1656 births
1746 deaths
People from Koper
17th-century Italian painters
Italian male painters
18th-century Italian painters
Italian Baroque painters
Istrian Italian people
18th-century Italian male artists